Rosko Gee is a Jamaican bassist, who has played with the English band Traffic on their albums When the Eagle Flies (1974) and The Last Great Traffic Jam (2005); with Go featuring Stomu Yamashta, Steve Winwood, Michael Shrieve, Klaus Schulze and Al Di Meola; and with the German band Can, along with former Traffic percussionist Rebop Kwaku Baah, appearing on the albums Saw Delight, Out of Reach and Can. He toured with Can in 1977 and also provided vocals for some of the band's songs during this period.

In 1983, he recorded an album with Zahara, a group with several notable members including Rebop Kwaku Baah (percussion), Paul Delph (keyboards), Bryson Graham (drums).

After recording with Traffic in 1974 he played in the Johnny Nash band, Sons of the Jungle.

He played bass in the house band of Harald Schmidt's various late night TV shows on German television from 1996 to 2014.

His band Rosko Gee & The Hooded Ones released its first single in January 2015.

References

Year of birth missing (living people)
Living people
English rock bass guitarists
Male bass guitarists
Progressive rock bass guitarists
Can (band) members
Traffic (band) members
Zahara (band) members